Portmead (or Port Mead) is a suburban district of Swansea, Wales which falls within the Penderry ward.  Portmead is mostly residential and approximates to the area either side of north western part of Petregethin Road.

Districts of Swansea